Palota is a village and municipality in the Medzilaborce District in the Prešov Region of far north-eastern Slovakia.

History
In historical records the village was first mentioned in 1330.

Geography
It has a population of about 190 people.

Gallery

References

External links
 
 
http://www.statistics.sk/mosmis/eng/run.html

Villages and municipalities in Medzilaborce District